High is the tenth studio album of British rock band New Model Army, released on 20 August 2007 in the United Kingdom, 24 August in Germany and 4 September in North America.

Track listing
All tracks written by Justin Sullivan, Nelson, Michael Dean, Dean White and Marshall Gill.

"Wired" – 3:19
"One of the Chosen" – 4:34
"High" – 4:38
"No Mirror, No Shadow" – 3:43
"Dawn" – 3:44
"All Consuming Fire" – 3:23
"Sky in Your Eyes" – 4:13
"Into the Wind" – 4:11
"Nothing Dies Easy" – 3:57
"Breathing" – 4:35
"Rivers" – 4:31
"Bloodsports" – 4:27

Personnel

Musicians
Justin Sullivan – vocals, guitar
Nelson – bass
Michael Dean – drums
Dean White – keyboards
Marshall Gill – guitars
Anna Esslemont – violins

Production
Chris Kimsey – producer, mixing
Chris West – engineer
Frank Cameli – engineer, mixing
Jon Astley – mastering
Joolz Denby – illustrations
Gem Pope – photography

References

The Official NMA Website
CD liner notes

New Model Army (band) albums
2007 albums
Albums produced by Chris Kimsey